Brannan and The Embarcadero station (often simply Brannan) is a Muni Metro light rail station located in the median of The Embarcadero south of Brannan Street in the South Beach area of San Francisco, California. Muni Metro trains use a high-level island platform, while historic streetcars use a pair of side platforms at the south end of the station.

History 

The station opened on January 10, 1998, as part of the Muni Metro Extension project. It was initially served by a temporary E Embarcadero line between Embarcadero station and 4th and King/Caltrain station. N Judah service replaced the shuttle service on August 22, 1998. T Third Street service began on April 7, 2007; N Judah service was initially cut back to Embarcadero station, with J Church service added at peak hours. On June 30, 2007, the J and N were restored to their previous configuration. E Embarcadero heritage streetcar service was added on August 1, 2015.

T Third Street service was rerouted off The Embarcadero and into the Central Subway on January 7, 2023.

References

External links 

SFMTA – The Embarcadero & Brannan St: northbound, southbound
SF Bay Transit (unofficial): The Embarcadero & Brannan St
Station on Google Maps Street View

Brannan
Railway stations in the United States opened in 1998
Brannan